Walter Thomas Heyn (born 14 November 1953) is a German guitarist, composer and music producer.

Life 
Born in Görlitz, Heyn was initially musically self-taught. From the age of fourteen he played guitar and performed in singing clubs. His composition teacher recommended him for the class of Siegfried Thiele. Heyn was then  for composition with Siegfried Matthus at the Academy of Arts, Berlin in (East) Berlin from 1985 to 1987. He was also a research assistant for composition at the Leipzig Academy of Music until 1984.

He took part in events of the Deutscher Verlag für Musik and the Leipzig district association of the composers' association. Heyn received in this time among others composition commissions from private stage music. His works Concerto grosso Nr. 1 op. 18 for 5 soloists and orchestra (1984) and Concerto grosso Nr. 2 op. 20 for 2 violins and orchestra (1987) were premiered by the Leipzig Gewandhaus orchestra under the direction of Kurt Masur. In 1990 he was one of the founders of the International Children's Music Centre Leipzig.

In 1991 he moved to Berlin. In 2000 then acquired the  the specialist publishing house for contemporary music. In 1996, he founded the record label  and appeared as music producer. He also founded the ensembles Kammerorchester Berlin and the Quintetto con brio.

Heyn received several awards, including the Hanns Eisler Prize for "3 Yiddish songs".

Work 
In the 80s, Heyn devoted himself to opera, theatre music and song. His first composition Four aphoristic songs (1980) was presented on a composer portrait at the Academy of Arts Berlin. His sound creations prove to be time-critical and cynical. For the Gruppe Neue Musik Hanns Eisler he composed Ich ist ein anderer. Rimbaud. From 1989 he concentrated on chamber music. In the late 90s, compositions in the field of literature & music followed. He worked together with the chanson singer . Heyn composes in all styles from Romantique to New Music. He is also an arranger of the works of Johann Sebastian Bach, Claudio Monteverdi, Modest Mussorgsky and Dmitri Shostakovich.

Scholarships, prizes and awards 
 Mendelssohn Scholarship of the Ministerium für Kultur of the DDR (1977/78 and 1978/79)
  (1984)
 Hanns Eisler Prize of the Rundfunk der DDR (1987)
 Scholarship of the Körber Foundation Hamburg (1991/93)

Discography 
 1996: Gitarra poetica (Kreuzberg Records)
 1997: Nicht jeder Abschied macht klein (Mara Records)
 1997: ZooMusik – MusikZoo (Kreuzberg Records)
 1998: Hommage à Alfred Berghorn (Kreuzberg Records)
 2000: Liebsamen Beschäftigung (Kreuzburg Records)
 2000: Bach meets Schostakowitsch (Kreuzberg Records)
 2000: Freimaurer Gesänge (Kreuzberg Records)
 2001: Opus (Kreuzberg Records)
 2001: Leipziger Legende (Kreuzberg Records)
 2002: Florestan-Quartett (Kreuzberg Records)
 2002: Missae sine Verbis (Kreuzberg Records)
 2002: Lebensgruß (Kreuzberg Records)
 2003: Passionen (Kreuzberg Records)

Literature 
 Hermann Neef: Der Beitrag der Komponisten Friedrich Goldmann, Friedrich Schenker, Paul-Heinz Dittrich und Thomas Heyn zur ästhetischen Diskussion der Gattung Oper in der DDR seit 1977. Dissertation, Halle 1989
 Ulrike Liedtke: Walter Thomas Heyn. In Komponisten der Gegenwart (KDG). Edition Text & Kritik, Munich 1996, .
 Heyn, Thomas. In Brockhaus, Riemann Musiklexikon. CD-Rom, Directmedia Publishing, Berlin 2004, .
 Heyn, Walter Thomas. In Axel Schniederjürgen (ed.): Kürschners Musiker-Handbuch. 5th edition, Saur Verlag, Munich 2006, .

References

External links 
 
Walter Thomas Heyn im Archiv Zeitgenössischer Komponisten der Sächsische Landesbibliothek – Staats- und Universitätsbibliothek Dresden
 
 Walter Thomas Heyn, KDG – Komponisten der Gegenwart, in Munzinger-Archiv Beginning of article free
 Vita und Werkliste von Walter Thomas Heyn at Klassika
 Walter Thomas Heyn at Edition Margaux
 Walter Thomas Heyn at Hartmann & Stauffacher

German record producers
20th-century classical composers
20th-century German composers
German music arrangers
Literary editors
German classical guitarists
1953 births
Living people
People from Görlitz